The Russell Smith Award is an annual award presented by the Dallas–Fort Worth Film Critics Association to "the best low-budget and cutting-edge independent film" since its inception in 2008. The award is named in honor of late Dallas Morning News film critic Russell Smith.

Winners
2008: Wendy and Lucy - Kelly Reichardt
2009: Precious - Lee Daniels
2010: Winter's Bone - Debra Granik
2011: We Need to Talk About Kevin - Lynne Ramsay
2012: Beasts of the Southern Wild - Benh Zeitlin
2013: Fruitvale Station - Ryan Coogler
2014: Boyhood - Richard Linklater
2015: Tangerine - Sean Baker
2016: Moonlight - Barry Jenkins
2017: The Florida Project - Sean Baker
2018: The Rider - Chloe Zhao
2019: The Lighthouse - Robert Eggers
2020: Minari - Lee Isaac Chung
2021: Flee - Jonas Poher Rasmussen
2022: EO - Jerzy Skolimowski

Multiple wins
Sean Baker - 2

See also
John Cassavetes Award
NBR Freedom of Expression
Academy Award for Best Picture

External links
 Official Dallas–Fort Worth Critics Association website

References

Awards established in 2008
Dallas–Fort Worth Film Critics Association Awards